Baby Love is a 2008 French comedy film directed and written by Vincent Garenq starring Lambert Wilson, Pilar López de Ayala and Pascal Elbé.

Cast 
 Lambert Wilson - Le docteur Emmanuel François Xavier Bernier 
 Pilar López de Ayala - Josefina Maria Paredes
 Pascal Elbé - Philippe
 Anne Brochet - Cathy
 Andrée Damant - Suzanne
 Florence Darel - Isa
 Marc Duret - Marc

Reception 

Isabelle Regnier from Le Monde, while praising the believable and sympathetic portrayal of a gay couple and the comprehensive depiction of social issues such as surrogacy and gay adoption, found the film "average" and noted that it resembles more a standard American romantic comedy than a French film. Jordan Mintzer from Variety Wrote "Uppity perf by Wilson adds plenty of sugar to the brew, and it’s contrasted nicely by Elbe’s commanding stoicism as the main character’s boyfriend. Spanish thesp Lopez De Ayala’s convincing turn as an immigrant caught among friendly but domineering interests is another plus" The Hollywood Reporter wrote that "Although the photography of Paris is fairly stock, the film is well-paced. Everyone pretty much gets what he or she wants by the end of the story, and while the triumphs are too easily earned, the actors and characters are so engaging that we don’t begrudge them their bliss"

Mirito Torreiro of Fotogramas rated the film with 3 out of 5 stars. He deemed the film's screenplay to be better than its making, ultimately considering however that, TV-movie looks notwithstanding, it is enjoyable to watch.

See also 
 List of French films of 2008

References

External links 

2008 comedy films
2008 films
Films about surrogacy
French comedy films
2000s French-language films
2000s French films
French pregnancy films